Self-limiting may refer to:

Self-limiting (biology), an organism or colony of organisms which limits its own growth 
Governor (device), used to control the speed of mechanical equipment to prevent it from operating at unsafe speeds
Electronic speed limiter, a system set by a manufacturer or by a driver to limit the maximum speed which can be reached by a road vehicle

See also 
 Self-regulation (disambiguation)